A general election will be held in the U.S. state of Louisiana on November 7, 2023.

Governor

Incumbent Governor John Bel Edwards is ineligible to seek a third consecutive term due to Louisiana's term limits.

Lieutenant Governor

Incumbent Lieutenant Governor Billy Nungesser is running for re-election. He had previously expressed interest in running for governor, but decided against it.

Attorney General

Incumbent Attorney General Jeff Landry is running for governor.

Secretary of State
Incumbent Secretary of State Kyle Ardoin is eligible to seek re-election.

Candidates

Declared
Mike Francis (Republican), Louisiana Public Service Commissioner and former chair of the Louisiana Republican Party
Brandon Trosclair (Republican), businessman

Potential
Kyle Ardoin (Republican), incumbent secretary of state

Treasurer
Incumbent Treasurer John Schroder is retiring to run for governor.

Candidates

Declared
John Fleming (Republican), former U.S. Representative for Louisiana's 4th congressional district (2009–2017)
Dustin Grange (Democratic), financial advisor)
Scott McKnight (Republican), state representative

Declined
John Schroder (Republican), incumbent treasurer (running for governor)

Commissioner of Agriculture and Forestry
Incumbent Agriculture commissioner Mike Strain is running for re-election.

Candidates

Declared
Mike Strain (Republican), incumbent commissioner

Commissioner of Insurance
Incumbent Insurance commissioner Jim Donelon is retiring.

Candidates

Declared
Tim Temple (Republican), insurance executive and candidate for insurance commissioner in 2019

Declined
Jim Donelon (Republican), incumbent commissioner

Board of Elementary and Secondary Education
All eight members of the Louisiana Board of Elementary and Secondary Education are up for re-election.

See also
 Elections in Louisiana
 Politics of Louisiana
 Political party strength in Louisiana

References

External links

 
Louisiana
Louisiana